Lyman Currier (born August 28, 1994) is an American  freestyle skier. Currier competed at the 2014 Winter Olympics in Sochi, Russia.

References

External links 
 
 
 
 
 
 

1994 births
Living people
American male freestyle skiers
Olympic freestyle skiers of the United States
Freestyle skiers at the 2014 Winter Olympics
Place of birth missing (living people)